Sheryl Bayley is a Barbadian former cricketer who played as a right-arm off break bowler. She appeared in eleven Test matches and one One Day International for the West Indies between 1976 and 1979. She played domestic cricket for Barbados.

In 1977, in a two-day match for Barbados against Guyana, Bailey took 9 wickets for 9 runs to help bowl the opposition out for 46.

References

External links
 
 

Living people
Date of birth missing (living people)
Year of birth missing (living people)
West Indian women cricketers
West Indies women Test cricketers
West Indies women One Day International cricketers
Barbadian women cricketers